Dovška Baba (1,891 m),, also sometimes known as Dovška Rožca although this actually refers to a pasture some 200 m below the summit, is a peak in the Western Karawanks. It lies on the border between Slovenia and Austria, above the village of Dovje. It is known as an ideal peak for ski touring.

The German and Slovene names are etymologically related: Frauenkogel means 'Woman's Peak', while Dovška Baba means 'Woman of Dovje'. (Dovška Rožca means 'Little Flower of Dovje'.)

References

External links
Information about Dovška Baba on Hribi.net

Mountains of Upper Carniola
Mountains of Carinthia (state)
Mountains of the Alps
Karawanks
One-thousanders of Austria